Melanostomias biseriatus is a species of ray-finned fish native to the deep waters of the Eastern Atlantic. It's a fairly long fish and the longest specimen measured .

References 

Fish described in 1930
Stomiidae
Fish of the East Atlantic